The 2015 Judo Grand Prix Düsseldorf was held at the Mitsubishi Electric Halle in Düsseldorf, Germany from 20 to 22 February 2015.

Medal summary

Men's events

Women's events

Source Results

Medal table

References

External links
 

2015 IJF World Tour
2015 Judo Grand Prix
Judo
Judo competitions in Germany
Judo